Vierka Berkyová (born 23 February 1991 in Lučenec, Czechoslovakia) is a Slovak musician, and the winner of the third season of Slovakia searching for a SuperStar in 2007. She is of Romani origin.

She and her family lived with the singer Ida Kellarová (cs) while working on the musical adaptation of Gypsies go to Heaven, which was depicted in the documentary "Vierka, or The Mystery of Family Bs Disappearance", filmed by Miroslav Janek (cs).

After winning the competition, she performed around Slovakia for some time, before leaving with her extended family for the UK, where she now lives. In 2014 she started working on her new album. In 2015 she released her first English single "This Love". She has also returned to Slovakia and given concerts there.

Slovensko hľadá SuperStar Performances

Singles
 2015: "This Love"
 2015: "Through the Fire"

References

1991 births
Living people
Idols (TV series) winners
People from Lučenec
Romani musicians
Romani singers
21st-century Slovak women singers
Slovak Romani people